Niedrzwica Duża  is a village in Lublin County, Lublin Voivodeship, in eastern Poland. It is the seat of the gmina (administrative district) called Gmina Niedrzwica Duża.

The village has a population of 3,300.

References

Villages in Lublin County